Scutellina is a genus of small limpet-like sea snails, marine gastropod mollusks in the family Phenacolepadidae.

Scutellina is now a synonym of Plesiothyreus Cossmann, 1888

Species
Species within the genus Scutellina include:
 Scutellina gruveli Dautzenberg, 1929

References

Phenacolepadidae